Trevor J. Megill (born December 5, 1993) is an American professional baseball pitcher for the Minnesota Twins of Major League Baseball (MLB). He has previously played in MLB for the Chicago Cubs. He was drafted by the San Diego Padres in the 7th round of the 2015 Major League Baseball draft.

Amateur career
Megill attended Marina High School in Huntington Beach, California. He left high school early, and graduated through Bixby Charter School. Undrafted out of high school, he attended Loyola Marymount University. Megill missed his junior season after undergoing Tommy John surgery. He was drafted by the St. Louis Cardinals in the 3rd round, with the 104th overall selection, of the 2014 MLB draft, but did not sign and returned to college. After the 2014 season, he played collegiate summer baseball with the Orleans Firebirds of the Cape Cod Baseball League.

Professional career

San Diego Padres
He was drafted by the San Diego Padres in the 7th round, with 207th overall selection, of the 2015 MLB draft, and signed with them.

Megill split the 2015 season between the AZL Padres and the Tri-City Dust Devils, going a combined 2–0 with a 3.16 ERA over 31.1 innings. Megill did not appear in a game in 2016 due to issues with bone spurs. He split the 2017 season between the AZL, Tri-City, and the Lake Elsinore Storm, going 5–0 with a 2.63 ERA over 27.1 innings. He split the 2018 season between the AZL, Lake Elsinore, and the San Antonio Missions, going a combined 2–1 with a 3.35 ERA over 37.2 innings. He split the 2019 season between the Lake Elsinore, the Amarillo Sod Poodles, and the El Paso Chihuahuas, going a combined 2–2 with a 3.86 ERA over 60.2 innings.

Chicago Cubs
On December 12, 2019, Megill was selected by the Chicago Cubs in the 2019 Rule 5 draft. On July 17, 2020, Megill was returned to the Padres organization. After being returned, the Cubs traded cash considerations to reacquire Megill.

Megill did not play in a game in 2020 due to the cancellation of the Minor League Baseball season because of the COVID-19 pandemic.

On April 26, 2021, Megill was selected to the 40-man roster and promoted to the major leagues. He made his MLB debut that day, pitching a scoreless 6th inning against the Atlanta Braves. In the game, Megill also notched his first major league strikeout, punching out Braves second baseman Ozzie Albies. Megill made 28 appearances in 2021, posting an 8.37 ERA and 30 strikeouts.

Minnesota Twins
On November 30, 2021, Megill was claimed off of waivers by the Minnesota Twins. However, the same day, Megill was non-tendered by the Twins and became a free agent. On December 5, Megill re-signed with the Twins on a minor league contract.

On May 21, 2022, Megill had his contract selected by the Twins.

Personal life
Megill's younger brother, Tylor, is a pitcher for the New York Mets.

See also
Rule 5 draft results

References

External links

Loyola Marymount Lions bio

1993 births
Living people
Águilas de Mexicali players
American expatriate baseball players in Mexico
Amarillo Sod Poodles players
Arizona League Padres players
Baseball players from Long Beach, California
Chicago Cubs players
El Paso Chihuahuas players
Lake Elsinore Storm players
Loyola Marymount Lions baseball players
Major League Baseball pitchers
Minnesota Twins players
Orleans Firebirds players
San Antonio Missions players
Tri-City Dust Devils players